In enzymology, an aldose-1-phosphate adenylyltransferase is an enzyme that catalyzes the chemical reaction

ADP + alpha-D-aldose 1-phosphate  phosphate + ADP-aldose

Thus, the two substrates of this enzyme are ADP and alpha-D-aldose 1-phosphate, whereas its two products are phosphate and ADP-aldose.

This enzyme belongs to the family of transferases, specifically those transferring phosphorus-containing nucleotide groups (nucleotidyltransferases).  The systematic name of this enzyme class is ADP:alpha-D-aldose-1-phosphate adenylyltransferase. Other names in common use include sugar-1-phosphate adenylyltransferase, ADPaldose phosphorylase, adenosine diphosphosugar phosphorylase, ADP sugar phosphorylase, adenosine diphosphate glucose:orthophosphate adenylyltransferase, and ADP:aldose-1-phosphate adenylyltransferase.

References

 
 

EC 2.7.7
Enzymes of unknown structure